Starks is an unincorporated community in Center Township, Washington County, Arkansas, United States. It is located on U.S. Route 62 between Farmington and Prairie Grove.

References

Unincorporated communities in Washington County, Arkansas
Unincorporated communities in Arkansas